Dalara is a genus of wasp in the family Crabronidae, tribe Larrini.

Species 
The genus Dalara contains 2 extant species:
Dalara mandibularis F. Williams, 1919
Dalara schlegelii (Ritsema, 1884)

See also 
Dalara garuda

References 

Crabronidae
Apoidea genera